, known as  and more commonly as , is a fictional character and professional wrestler from Capcom's Street Fighter fighting game series. She was introduced in the 1998 game Street Fighter Alpha 3, and later returned in the 2016 game Street Fighter V. The character has received mixed critical reception since her appearance in the 2016 title.

Creation and character

Concept
R. Mika was created to introduce a "tricky and technical character" into the series. Later, the team created Karin to provide a contrast to her. Debuting in Street Fighter Alpha 3, Mika is primarily a grappling character, whose main weapons are high-priority command throws. Unlike other grapplers in the Street Fighter series, who are slow and heavy, Mika is more fast and agile. Ozzie Mejia from Shacknews notes that her playstyle in Street Fighter V resembles that of El Fuerte from Street Fighter IV. Her color scheme was inspired by Lisa Kusanami from Sega fighting game Last Bronx and her mask is similar to that of Yatterman-2 from Tatsunoko's Yatterman anime.

Appearances
In the games, Mika is a blonde Japanese girl who plans to make her debut as a professional wrestler and is seen working hard to achieve her dream to become "Star of the Ring". To this end, she travels the world, fighting various street fighters to promote herself and meeting her idol Zangief along the way. She receives rigorous training from her manager, Yoko Harmagedon, a large muscular woman who is seen in a few of her victory poses riding a golf cart and wielding a shinai.

Mika first appeared in Street Fighter Alpha 3, and later returned in Street Fighter V, where she is joined by a tag-team partner named Yamato Nadeshiko (大和ナデシコ), who is used in some of her attacks. Mika also appears in minor roles in the UDON's comic series Street Fighter II: Turbo, Street Fighter Legends: Sakura, and Super Street Fighter: New Generations. She also has a cameo in the Capcom game Startling Adventures and in Capcom Fighting Evolution in Felicia's ending. Her attire appears as a swap costume for Tekken character Kuma in Street Fighter X Tekken. After a long period of absence, Mika returned in Street Fighter V, sporting her original character design.

Characteristics
Mika has long, blonde hair with bangs that are tied in two geometrical pigtails and she also has blue eyes. Her attire is a blue and white lingerie-like leotard with ruffles around areas such as the collar, the sleeves, and the leg-holes, knee-length wrestling boots with white stockings, a white bustier with her leotard chest piece covered by two blue heart shaped patterns (in SFV the blue hearts were replaced by a heart-shaped window), completed with a blue eye-mask. This is stark contrast to many of the Japanese characters of Street Fighter who often tend to have black and/brown hair and eyes respectively (with the exception of Karin Kanzuki). Her attire is meant to be flamboyant, so she can stand out from the more experienced wrestling pools and circles. She possibly aims for making her arm joints less constricted due to the exposed portions of her uniform around her elbows, shoulders, breasts, back and buttocks. Her outfit is considered to be one of the most revealing designs of all the series' playable female characters.

Scrapped appearance
She is a personal favorite of the Street Fighter series' producer Yoshinori Ono, who had tried but failed to bring the character in Street Fighter IV: "I'm a big Rainbow Mika fan, I don't know if you remember her. So I wanted to put her in Street Fighter 4 and I really wanted to put her in 'Super,' so I basically harassed the director. Unfortunately he didn't listen but maybe next time."

Other media
R. Mika appears in the fan short film Street Fighter: Best (Friends) Forever portrayed by professional wrestler Zeda Zhang.

Reception

Critical response
Prior to her return in Street Fighter V, Mika has been requested by Street Fighter fans and video game publications alike. Heavy.com listed Mika as their fourth most wanted character they wanted to appear in Ultra Street Fighter IV while GamesRadar listed her as one of their preferred choices to appear in Street Fighter V. Jahanzeb Khan at Hardcore Gamer listed her as one of five characters he wanted to see return in SFV, where he noted "Having a highly technical and badass female wrestler would spice up the roster and game balance of Street Fighter V, not to mention a nice alternative to the male heavyweights." Prima Games listed her as one of the characters they wanted to see in SFV, where they opined that she would "add more feminine talent to the game."

Negatively, Mika was included in Complex'''s list of the "lamest" Street Fighter characters, reasoning "Street Fighter has never been shy with the gorgeous ladies, but they've always had full-figured back stories to go along with their full-figured backsides. Rainbow Mika on the other hand is the most blatant example of mysogynistic  character design seen in the series." Todd Ciolek from Anime News Network declared Mika as "the worst Street Fighter character," reasoning "every little detail about her annoyed me, from the stupid boob-hearts on her costume to the way she whomped opponents with her butt—and rubbed it after she hit the ground." At Paste, Eric Van Allen criticized her outfit by stating that "even by Street Fighter standards, this amount of gratuitous flesh is rather ridiculous." However, this opinion is not shared between all critics, with Nadia Oxford of USgamer finding Mika to be an example of positive female gender representation, writing "I can say that I have nothing against, er, voluptuous women in games. Or even scantily-clad women", and that "My problem has always been women characters whom I'm expected to take seriously while they slay dragons/wander the desert/travel the frozen wastes while baring their midriff through the majority of their journey", and that she enjoys Mika's "silly" and "goofy" design.

Mika's return to the lineup of Street Fighter V was praised by Jason Schreier of Kotaku, who wrote that "She looks fun to play—check out those wrestling moves — but this is an odd choice given Mika’s lack of pedigree. Cool throwback, though!" However, after the game's released, her gameplay has subsequently been criticized for being "cheap". At Eurogamer, Wesley Yin-Poole labelled Mika as SFVs "most hated character", writing "I've seen people criticise R. Mika players for doing nothing but going for this Passion Rope Throw over and over again until it lands. Some within the fighting game community believe this move, as well as the 'vortex' style, is not a 'high skill' strategy", and as a result Mika has been labelled "cheap" and a "troll character" that is frustrating to play against. According to Christopher Isaac at Screen Rant, she is the 12th most powerful Street Fighter character. Isaac explained by saying "The wrestler's unorthodox usage of her tag team partner Yamato, body slams, and booty slams to the face have been throwing players for a loop lately, and has led to the phrases 'overpowered' and 'broken' getting thrown around." At Den of Geek, Gavin Jasper ranked her as the 43rd best Street Fighter character, whom reasoned "While seeing her bust out Stone Cold Stunners is good fun, the way they’ve transformed her into a sexualized rodeo clown does get kind of embarrassing at times."

Controversy

In debut footage of Street Fighter V, Mika is seen slapping her butt as part of her Critical Art attack. The decision not to show the animation in the North American version of the game was a subject of controversy, leading to a petition to restore it. According to producer Yoshinori Ono regarding not showing her butt slap, "Those changes came up internally. We decided to remove that because we want the biggest possible number of people to play, and we don’t want to have something in the game that might make someone uncomfortable." Some other shots, including the entrance animation for Cammy, were also replaced.

Jonathan Holmes from Destructoid questioned the controversy over the decision by stating "While there are surely plenty of folks who adore seeing their screen filled with frilly thong shots, I imagine there may be even more players out there who'd find the sudden prioritization of arse in their fighting games to be little out of place." Chris Carter at Destructoid commented "It's still a bit weird that something this goofy was removed, especially with the design Laura has in general," and noted that a character like Necalli is "probably far more harmful" for children's eyes. In another article by Destructoid, Carter stated "It's such a weird thing to me, because R. Mika's butt is still very visible, she just doesn't lightly tap it a few times per match." Likewise, ND Medina at iDigitalTimes'' expressed confusion over the change, noting that her butt was still being exposed. Her butt slap was later restored as a mod for the PC version, albeit in a different pose.

References

Capcom protagonists
Female characters in video games
Fictional Japanese people in video games
Fictional professional wrestlers
Street Fighter characters
Video game characters introduced in 1998
Woman soldier and warrior characters in video games